Oh My Friend is a 2011 Telugu-language romantic drama film written and directed by newcomer Venu Sri Ram. It stars Siddharth,Hansika and Shruti Haasan with Navdeep in an important extended cameo. It was produced by Dil Raju. The film's title is based on a song from Happy Days (2007).

Plot
Chandu (Siddharth) and Siri (Shruti Haasan) are childhood friends, affectionately calling each other "Faltoos" and "Killer", respectively. Their friendship remains intact as they grow up. Chandu was sent to Mumbai to do an MBA, but learned music instead and returns to the agony of his father. Siri convinces Chandu's father that it is her responsibility to take care of Chandu's career. They go for an audition where they get into a fight with a band and he is sent out. Before that, Siri accepts a love proposal from Uday (Navdeep), who lives in the US, after consulting Chandu. Later, Chandu and Siri accidentally meet their mutual friend in college, Ritu Sharma (Hansika Motwani), and Chandu falls in love with her at first sight. Chandu starts spending time with Ritu to impress her, but Siri feels that she is being avoided. Siri decides to leave for a dancing school in Chennai. Meanwhile, Ritu accepts Chandu's love proposal. When Siri is about to leave, Chandu apologises to her that he had not noticed that she was being avoided. At the same time, Uday comes back from the US to surprise her. Hence, she decides not to leave.

Chandu decides to attend the Airtel music competition in Kochi as a lead guitarist in a band. Siri, Uday and Ritu accompany him there. They stay in a hotel, where Clarity Kanna Rao (Ali) is the servant. Chandu gets his practice through the band which he fought but they later become friends. Chandu wins the competition with a guitar given by Siri. However, the events in Kochi display a deep friendship between Chandu and Siri attracts the jealousy of both Ritu and Uday. Finally, Uday calls for a break up by asking to decide between him and Chandu. Chandu's father defends Uday's opinion and asks Chandu and Siri to realise their love. But, Chandu insists that their friendship cannot be turned into love and tells Uday to marry Siri, promising him that he will not be in touch, see her and talk to her ever. The movie ends with Siri giving birth to Uday's child, while Chandu and Ritu, now a married couple, come to see them at the hospital.

At the hospital, Uday realizes his mistake of separating them and asks Chandu and Siri to become friends again. They both reunite. The four friends leave with Siri and Uday's baby in Chandu's car.

Cast

 Siddharth as Chandrakiran / Chandu "Faltoos", Siri's childhood best friend
 Hansika Motwani as Ritu Sharma, Chandu and Siri's old college mate and Chandu's love interest, later wife
 Shruti Haasan as Siri Chandana "Killer", Chandu's childhood best friend
 Navdeep as Uday, Siri's love interest, later husband
 Tanikella Bharani as Chandu's father
 Lakshmi Ramakrishnan as Chandu's mother
 Vinaya Prasad as Siri's mother
 Ali as Clarity Kanna Rao
 Raghu Babu as Lahari Resort Worker
 Sivannarayana Naripeddi as Chandu's father's coworker

Production
Siddharth plays the lead role. The actress Shruti Haasan replaced Amrita Rao as the second heroine. Earlier, Samantha Ruth Prabhu was planned as the female lead but was later replaced by Rao because a Hindi dubbed version was probable. Hansika Motwani was brought in to play the main female lead. The film also had photo shoots with the actresses Amala Paul and Nithya Menen, with the latter suggesting that Siddharth wanted Shruti Haasan in the role.

For the first time in the Telugu film industry, Oh My Friend movie had online piracy protection called ORNB's MovieGuard.

The film score and soundtrack were composed by the Kerala State Film Award winner Rahul Raj, who made his debut in Telugu cinema after ten films in Malayalam cinema.

Several photo sessions were held on 17 January 2011. Shooting commenced on 21 February 2011. The first audio teaser was released on 6 August.

Soundtrack

All the music was composed, arranged and programmed by Rahul Raj, except "Sri Chaitanya" which was composed by Anil R.

The Telugu film portal 123telugu concluded by giving the verdict "The album of 'Oh my Friend' feels fresh and youthful. There are some terrific tracks in the album. Malayalam music director Rahul Raj makes an impressive Telugu debut with this movie."

The audio had record sales of 300,000 CDs within nine days of release. The Times of India called it "Rahul rage in Tollywood". The cast and crew hosted the "Triple Platinum Disc" celebrations on 5 November 2011, six days before the film's release.

The audio was released on 15 October 2011. The audio release function, at Shilpakala Vedika in Hyderabad, was telecast live on MAA TV. The movie was released on 11 November 2011.

Telugu version

Tamil version

Release
The Telugu version of the film was released on 11 November 2011 and a dubbed Tamil version of the film was released on 20 May 2012, under the title Sridhar.. The movie was released in Malayalam as Njanum Ente Sreeyum on 15 December 2017 and was premiered on Flowers TV. It Was Later Dubbed In Hindi As The Same Title Of This Name And It Was Distributed By Shemaroo Entertainment.

Reception
Oh My Friend received mixed reviews from critics and was well received by the audience. Oneindia was positive, predicting that it would do well at multiplexes. Radhika Rajamani from Rediff said it was a feel-good entertainer that is "honest, refreshing, and true to life".

Idlebrain said that the producer Dil Raju had made a brave attempt to make a film without any commercial padding. B V S Prakash of Deccan Chronicle rated the movie 2 out of 5, calling it "just another run-of-the-mill film". Y Sunita Chowdary for Cinegoer called it a pretty average film, but also said that one could watch it for the star cast. Deepa Garimella of Fullhyd praised the film's interplay of characters, and the visuals and the music, but found the ending "an ending a serious violation of audience expectations", besides calling the plot predictable. She rated it 5 out of 10. Oneindia said the narration was slow and subject clichéd, while praising the music and lead cast's performance as a saving grace.

References

External links

2010s Telugu-language films
Films scored by Rahul Raj
2011 films
Indian romantic drama films
2011 romantic drama films
Sri Venkateswara Creations films